Grindelia microcephala, the littlehead gumweed, is a North American species of flowering plants in the family Asteraceae. It is native to the south-central United States, having been found only in the state of Texas.

Grindelia microcephala grows in rich bottom lands along streams. The plant usually produces numerous flower heads in open, flat-topped arrays. Each head has 16-27 ray flowers, surrounding a large number of tiny disc flowers.

References

microcephala
Endemic flora of Texas
Plants described in 1836
Flora without expected TNC conservation status